Jaime Morgan Stubbe, the last Executive Director of the Puerto Rico Maritime Authority or "Navieras de Puerto Rico', is currently the President of Palmas del Mar, Inc., the real estate developer that owns and operates the Palmas del Mar residential and tourist complex in Humacao, Puerto Rico. He and his wife, artist Jochefi Morgan, live in Guaynabo, Puerto Rico, with their children, Jaime, Regina, and Alejandro.

Education
A 1976 graduate of Colegio Marista in his hometown Guaynabo, Puerto Rico, he obtained in May, 1980 his bachelor's degree at Tulane University in New Orleans, Louisiana, where he was elected president of Tulane's Latin and American Students Association (LASA), before pursuing his law degree, specializing in admiralty, or maritime law.

Public service
Appointed by the Governor of Puerto Rico, Pedro Rossello in 1993, as Executive Director of Navieras, he was responsible for the privatization of Navieras de Puerto Rico, an entity created in the 1970s when during the first administration of Governor Rafael Hernández Colón the government of Puerto Rico bought out the assets of the largest shipping line serving the mainland United States-Puerto Rico market.  The entity never turned a profit in 20 years of operation.

Morgan Stubbe subsequently in 1994 was appointed by the Governor to serve as Administrator of the Puerto Rico Economic Development Administration and Chairman and CEO of Puerto Rico Industrial Development Company under Puerto Rico's first Secretary of Economic Development and Commerce, Luis Fortuño, during Governor Pedro Rosselló's first term in office, where he helped fine-tune Puerto Rico's economic development strategy as Congress did away with the multibillion-dollar per year federal tax incentives for Puerto Rico manufacturing activity codified under Section 936 of the federal Internal Revenue Code and helped fashion the transitional wage credit that substituted Section 936, codified as Section 30A of the Code. He co-authored the 1998 Industrial Incentives Act, merged the Puerto Rico Economic Development Administration into the Puerto Rico Industrial Development Company reducing redundancy, cutting operating costs and streamlining the agencies job and investment creation processes. He also served in multiple boards such as Science and Technology (President), Economic Development Bank (Vice-President), Ports Authority, AFICA, Foreign Exports Board, Land Authority and others.

Professional life
Prior to entering public service, Morgan Stubbe was an active practitioner of maritime law in Puerto Rico, mostly in the U.S Federal Court. He also counseled corporate clients on real estate and tax matters.   After leaving government service, he has reenergized and dramatically expanded the size of the Palmas del Mar community, as president of the real estate and resort development company, Palmas del Mar Properties, Inc,(PDMPI) for almost a decade.  PDMPI is the Master Plan developer for this  coastal resort community. He is President of the Board of Directors of Palmas del Mar Utility, Inc which operates this community's water system and also is the President of the Palmas del Mar Architectural Review Board. He was elected in 2007 to the Board of Directors of Triple S Management Corp. (TSM), one of the largest Puerto Rican publicly traded corporations ($1.5Bn in revenues in '07), serves as Vice-Chairman of Seguros Triple S (TSM's Property & Casualty subsidiary); Member of the Board of the Puerto Rico Homebuilders Association since 2000 and Trustee of The Palmas Academy since 2000.

References

External links
Secinfo.com
Rootsweb.com

Sources
The Tulane Jambalaya Yearbook, Vol. 85, Bob Kottler, editor

American real estate businesspeople
Puerto Rican people of German descent
People from Guaynabo, Puerto Rico
Tulane University alumni
Living people
Year of birth missing (living people)